Natural Selection is a manuscript written by Charles Darwin, in which he presented his theory of natural selection and its role in biological evolution.
He did not publish the full work while he was alive, but wrote an abstract, titled On the Origin of Species by Means of Natural Selection, or the Preservation of Favoured Races in the Struggle for Life, which he published in 1859. He published the first two chapters of the manuscript, with additions, in 1868 as the two volume book The Variation of Animals and Plants Under Domestication.

Darwin regarded Natural Selection as his main work, while On the Origin of Species was written for a wider audience. He always intended to finish Natural Selection, but because of frail health, the publicity and work involved in publishing six editions of On the Origin of Species, plus other research and publications, he never got around to finish it.

The unpublished eight and a half chapters of Natural Selection were among the manuscripts collated after Darwin's death, and were first transcribed and published in 1975.

External links
 Charles Darwin's Natural Selection; being the second part of his big species book written from 1856 to 1858. Cambridge: Cambridge University Press - darwin-online.org.uk

Works by Charles Darwin
Manuscripts in Cambridge